Kevin Canty (born 1986) is an Irish hurler and footballer who currently plays in midfield for the Valley rovers senior football team and centre forward for the Premier intermediate hurling team.

Canty made his debut for the Cork county team in the 2007 championship. He remained on the panel for just two seasons. He subsequently joined the London county team during the 2011 Nicky Rackard Cup, and secured a Nicky Rackard Cup medal that same year.

At club level Canty began his career with Valley Rovers. He had spells  with the St Gabriel's club in London and Galway in Boston for a summer. On his return from London, Canty returned to his local club Valley Rovers. Canty has won numerous medals with his club Valley Rovers at juvenile level, including an All Ireland Féile and at adult level including  1 x intermediate football county, 2 x premier intermediate football county and 1 x intermediate hurling County.

References

1986 births
Living people
Cork inter-county hurlers
Irish expatriate sportspeople in England
Irish expatriate sportspeople in the United States
London inter-county hurlers
St Gabriel's hurlers
Valley Rovers hurlers